James Graham (2 March 1875 – 24 January 1942) was a Scottish first-class cricketer.

Graham was born at Kilmarnock in March 1875. A club cricketer for Kilmarnock, Graham made a single appearance in first-class cricket for Scotland against the touring South Africans at Glasgow in 1924. Playing in the Scottish side as a leg break googly bowler, he took one wicket in the match, that of South African captain Mick Commaille. Batting twice in the match from the tail, he ended the Scotland first innings unbeaten without scoring, while in their second innings he was dismissed without scoring by Cec Dixon. Graham was the victim of a burglary in March 1931, where a substantial amount of money and gold coins were stolen. He died at Clackmannan in January 1942.

References

External links
 

1875 births
1942 deaths
Sportspeople from Kilmarnock
Scottish cricketers